The Kvitbjørn disaster occurred on 28 August 1947 when, in heavy fog, the Norwegian Air Lines Short Sandringham flying boat Kvitbjørn, registered LN-IAV, hit a mountain close to Lødingsfjellet in Lødingen, southern Tjeldsundet, Norway.

The flying boat crashed en route from Harstad to Bodø, the two stopovers between its origin Tromsø and destination Oslo. All thirty-five people on board (twenty-eight passengers and a crew of seven) perished, making the crash the deadliest in Norwegian aviation at that time.

References

External links 
 https://web.archive.org/web/20110724180209/http://www.isorreisa.no/i/art.php?art=10147
 https://web.archive.org/web/20080922220551/http://ktsorens.tihlde.org/flyvrak/lodingen.html

Aviation accidents and incidents in Norway
Aviation accidents and incidents in the Arctic
Aviation accidents and incidents in 1947
Airliner accidents and incidents involving controlled flight into terrain
Norwegian Air Lines accidents and incidents
August 1947 events in Europe